The men's 10,000 metres event at the 1955 Pan American Games was held at the Estadio Universitario in Mexico City on 13 March.

Results

References

Athletics at the 1955 Pan American Games
1955